Beatrix Alice Lehmann (1 July 1903 – 31 July 1979) was a British actress, theatre director, writer and novelist.

Early life and family
Lehmann was born in Bourne End, Buckinghamshire. She came from a family of notable achievers: the third of four children of author and publisher Rudolph Chambers Lehmann. Her great-uncle was Henri Lehmann the artist. Her brother was publisher John Lehmann and one of her two older sisters was the novelist Rosamond Lehmann.

Career
Lehmann trained at RADA and made her stage debut as Peggy in a 1924 production The Way of the World at the Lyric Hammersmith. She also appeared in films and on television. She wrote short stories and two novels, including Rumour of Heaven, first published in 1934. In 1946 Lehmann became director and producer of the Arts Council Midland Theatre Company.

She was awarded Britain's Radio Actress of the Year in 1977. In 1962 she played the matriarch Bernadette Amorelle in a Maigret episode, The Dirty House. She played Susan Calvin in "The Prophet" (1967), a now lost episode of the British science fiction television series Out of the Unknown, and appeared in the Doctor Who serial The Stones of Blood (1978) as Professor Emilia Rumford. In 1979 she played Mrs Pleasant in a film version of The Cat and The Canary. Other roles include Z-Cars, The Spy Who Came in from the Cold, A Funny Thing Happened on the Way to the Forum, War and Peace, Love for Lydia, Staircase, and Crime and Punishment.

Death
Lehmann died in Camden, London, aged 76.

There are 12 portraits of Lehmann in the British National Portrait Gallery Collection.

Filmography
 The Passing of the Third Floor Back (1935) as Miss Kite
 Strangers on Honeymoon (1936) as Elfrida
 The Rat (1937) as Marguerite
 Candles at Nine (1944) as Julia Carberry, Everard's Housekeeper
 The Key (1958) as Housekeeper
 On the Fiddle (1961) as Lady Edith
 Psyche 59 (1964) as Mrs. Crawford
 The Spy Who Came in from the Cold (1965) as Tribunal President
 A Funny Thing Happened on the Way to the Forum (1966) as Domina's Mother
 Wonderwall (1968) as Mother
 The Portrait of a Lady  (1968, TV Series) as Lydia Touchett
 Staircase (1969) as Charlie's Mother
 The Cat and the Canary (1978) as Mrs. Pleasant 
 The Stones of Blood (Doctor Who)  (1978) as Professor Rumford

References

External links
  Performances listed in Theatre Archive University of Bristol
 
 Beatrix Lehmann Obituary in The New York Times

1903 births
1979 deaths
Lehmann family
English stage actresses
English film actresses
English television actresses
Alumni of RADA
20th-century English actresses
Actresses from Buckinghamshire
20th-century British businesspeople
English LGBT actors
20th-century English LGBT people